Friday Mosque is a mosque in Nouakchott, Mauritania. It is located just southeast of the Lebanese International University on the Avenue Gamal Abdel Nasser, next to the Judiciary Palace and the headquarters of Air Mauritania.

See also
 Islam in Mauritania

Mosques in Mauritania
Buildings and structures in Nouakchott